Radmilo Pavlović (29 August 1981 – 11 September 2021) was a Serbian footballer who played as a defender.

References

External links
 
 

1981 births
2021 deaths
Sportspeople from Kruševac
Association football defenders
Serbian footballers
FK Napredak Kruševac players
FK Trayal Kruševac players
Serbian SuperLiga players